Cogumelo Records is a Brazilian independent record label that concentrates on heavy metal bands.

Cogumelo Records first began as a record store in Belo Horizonte in 1980 and in 1985 became a record label. The same year the label would release a split album by Overdose and Sepultura.

In 1986, they released Sepultura's first album, Morbid Visions.

Signed bands and previous artists
 Absolute Disgrace
 Akerbeltz
 Attomica
 Calvary Death
 Chakal
 Drowned
 Hammurabi
 Headhunter DC
 Holocausto
 Impurity
 Kamikaze
 Lethal Curse
 Lustful
 Mutilator
 Overdose
 Pathologic Noise
 Pato Fu
 Perpetual Dusk
 Sarcófago
 Scourge
 Sepultura
 Sextrash
 Siecrist
 Siegrid Ingrid
 Sociedade Armada
 Thespian
 Vulcano
 Witchhammer

External links

Brazilian record labels